Bodrida is an insular hamlet in the community of Rhosyr, Ynys Môn, Wales, which is  from Cardiff and  from London.

References

See also
List of localities in Wales by population

Villages in Anglesey